NADPH oxidase activator 1 is an enzyme that in humans is encoded by the NOXA1 gene.

References

Further reading